Phthitia is a genus of flies belonging to the family Lesser Dung flies.

Species
Subgenus Alimosina Roháček, 1983
P. empiricus (Hutton, 1901)
P. rennelli (Harrison, 1964)
Subgenus Collimosina Roháček, 1983
P. quadricercus Marshall in Marshall & Smith, 1992
P. spinosa (Collin, 1930)
Subgenus Kimosina Roháček, 1983
P. antillensis Marshall in Marshall & Smith, 1992
P. antipoda (Roháček, 1984)
P. bicalyx Marshall in Marshall & Smith, 1992
P. bicornis Su & Liu, 2009
P. cercipilis Marshall in Marshall & Smith, 1992
P. chilenica (Duda, 1925)
P. ciliata (Duda, 1918)
P. digiseta Marshall in Marshall & Smith, 1992
P. digistylus Marshall in Marshall & Smith, 1992
P. emarginata Marshall, 2009
P. glabrescens (Villeneuve, 1917)
P. levigena (Spuler, 1925)
P. lineasterna Marshall in Marshall & Smith, 1992
P. lobocercus Marshall in Marshall & Smith, 1992
P. longisetosa (Dahl, 1909)
P. luteocercus Marshall in Marshall & Smith, 1992
P. luteofrons Marshall in Marshall & Smith, 1992
P. merida Marshall in Marshall & Smith, 1992
P. mulroneyi Marshall in Marshall & Smith, 1992
P. nigrifacies Marshall in Marshall & Smith, 1992
P. notthomasi Marshall in Marshall & Smith, 1992
P. obunca Marshall in Marshall & Smith, 1992
P. occimosa Marshall in Marshall & Smith, 1992
P. ovicercus Marshall in Marshall & Smith, 1992
P. plesiocercus Marshall, 2009
P. plumosula (Rondani, 1880)
P. sicana (Munari, 1988)
P. soikai (Munari, 1990)
P. spinicalyx Marshall in Marshall & Smith, 1992
P. squamosa Marshall in Marshall & Winchester, 1999
P. thomasi (Harrison, 1959)
Subgenus Phthitia Enderlein, 1938
P. alexandri Richards, 1955
P. charpentieri Marshall & Smith, 1995
P. cortesi Marshall & Smith, 1995
P. gonzalezi Marshall & Smith, 1995
P. miradorensis Marshall & Smith, 1995
P. sanctaehelenae (Richards, 1951)
P. selkirki (Enderlein, 1938)
P. venosa Enderlein, 1938
Subgenus Rufolimosina Papp, 2008
P. ornata Papp, 2008
P. oswaldi Papp, 2008

References

Sphaeroceridae
Diptera of Asia
Diptera of Europe
Diptera of South America
Diptera of North America
Diptera of Australasia
Brachycera genera